Renato Santos may refer to:

 Renato Santos (footballer, born 1987), Brazilian footballer
 Renato Santos (footballer, born 1991), Portuguese footballer
 Renato Dias Santos (born 1987), Brazilian striker
 Renato Santos (judoka) (born 1964), Portuguese judoka